John Waterbury is an American academic and former president of the American University of Beirut.

Early years
Born in Elizabeth, New Jersey, Waterbury attended Princeton University (BA 1961), studied Arabic at the American University of Cairo (1961–62), and got his PhD in political science in 1968 at Columbia University. He went on to the University of Michigan as assistant professor of political science.

Career
In 1971 he joined the American Universities Field Staff, a consortium of American Universities, which he represented in Cairo from 1971 to 1977. His monographs for AUFS were tops among his contemporaries and he became a leading source about life and politics in Egypt for academic and government specialists for half-a-decade.. The quality of these publications led directly to his appointment at the W.Wilson School of Public and International Affairs cited below. In the winter of 1972, he was a visiting professor at the AUFS facility in Rome. During 1977-78 he was visiting professor at the University of Aix-Marseille III in France.

He was then, for nearly twenty years, professor of politics and international affairs at Princeton University's Woodrow Wilson School of Public and International Affairs. He specialized in the political economy of the developing countries with a special focus on the Middle East. He was director of Princeton's Center of International Studies and editor of the academic journal World Politics from 1992 to 1998.

In 1998, Waterbury became the 14th president of the American University of Beirut, a post he held until 2008. He was the first president to reside in Beirut since 1984. During his tenure at AUB, Waterbury sought to restore the university to its long-standing place and reputation as an institution of higher learning meeting the highest international standards. AUB offered Waterbury an Honorary Doctorate during his last commencement exercises at the university in recognition of his achievements. University of Chicago Egyptologist Peter Dorman succeeded him as the 15th president of AUB on July 1, 2008.

He is now a Global Professor of Political Science in New York University (Abu Dhabi).

Works

References

Heads of universities and colleges in the United States
Academic staff of the American University of Beirut
University of Michigan faculty
Princeton University faculty
Columbia Graduate School of Arts and Sciences alumni
Living people
American University of Beirut trustees
Princeton University alumni
Academic staff of New York University Abu Dhabi
Year of birth missing (living people)